Ganesan Selvam is an Indian politician. He was elected to the Lok Sabha, lower house of the Parliament of India from Kancheepuram, Tamil Nadu in the 2019 Indian general election as member of the Dravida Munnetra Kazhagam.

Family and Education 
He completed his Master of Commerce in Pachaiyappa's College for Men, Kanchipuram in 2000. He received M.Phil in Alagappa University in 2013. He and his wife S. Sakila has 3 children's.

2019 Loksabha 
He contested in 2019 Loksabha election from Kancheepuram constituency and won with margin of 2,86,632 votes then Anna Dravida Munnetra Kazhagam candidate Maragatham K.

References

External links
 Official biographical sketch in Parliament of India website

India MPs 2019–present
Lok Sabha members from Tamil Nadu
Living people
Dravida Munnetra Kazhagam politicians
1974 births